Aubigny-les-Pothées is a commune in the Ardennes department in the Grand Est region of northern France.

The inhabitants of the commune are known as Aubignois or Aubignoises.

Geography

Aubigny-les-Pothées is located some 25 km west of Charleville-Mézières and 13 km north of Signy-l'Abbaye. Access to the commune is by road D978 from Logny-Bogny in the west which passes through the commune and the village and continues east to Rouvroy-sur-Audry. The D985 branches off the D978 at the eastern border of the commune and goes south to Signy-l'Abbaye. The minor D20 road goes north from the village to Auvillers-les-Forges. A railway line passes through the commune from east to west but there is no station in the commune. The nearest station is at Liart to the west. The commune is mixed forest and farmland.

The Audry river flows through the commune and the village from west to east and continues east to join the Sormonne south of Sormonne.

Neighbouring communes and villages

History

Two Merovingian cemeteries have been identified in the commune: one at a place called Bocmont, the other at a place called Croix-Ancelet. The bodies showed the characteristic positioning of arms along the body and legs separated which predominated in the region in the 6th and 7th centuries.

In the 13th century the village was the main town in les Potées ecclesiastical domain which was a possession of the chapter of Reims. The letter h in Pothées was introduced later. Aubigny was the main town of this possession.

In 1436 people from Liège burned the Chateau of Aubigny.

In the early days of the First World War in 1914, the village church was a very basic hospital. Straw scattered on the ground served as a bed for the wounded.

Heraldry

Administration

List of Successive Mayors

Aubigny-les-Pothées has adhered to the charter of the Regional Natural Park of the Ardennes since its creation in December 2011.

Demography
In 2017 the commune had 315 inhabitants.

Sites and monuments

Notable people linked to the commune
Edouard Piette (1827-1906) Archaeologist and pre-historian, born in Aubigny-les-Pothées

See also
Communes of the Ardennes department

References

External links
Aubigny-les-Pothées on Géoportail, National Geographic Institute (IGN) website 
Aubigny on the 1750 Cassini Map

Communes of Ardennes (department)